The Adel DeSoto Minburn (ADM) School District is a public school district in the Des Moines Metro headquartered in Adel, Iowa.

The district, mostly in Dallas County, includes a small portion in Madison County. It serves the Iowa communities of Adel, De Soto, and Minburn, and is located on the west edge of the Des Moines Metro area.

ADM has consistently been recognized for high levels of academic achievement as measured by the Iowa Department of Education's Iowa School Performance Profiles. ADM high school has regularly been identified as one of the top 10 high schools in Iowa and one of the top 5 high schools in the Des Moines Metro by US News. ADM has been recognized by the  Belin-Blank Center for Gifted Education and Talent Development as a STEM (science, technology, engineering, math) innovator and offers high school Project Lead the Way courses in engineering and biomedical science, a STEM Excellence and Leadership program for middle school students, and an innovative agricultural technology curriculum. Among several notable alumni is Nile Kinnick, Iowa's only Heisman Trophy winner as a scholar and athlete at The University of Iowa in 1939, who attended school in the district until his junior year.

History

The district formed on July 1, 1993, as a result of the merger of the Adel–De Soto Community School District and the Central Dallas Community School District.

Enrollment

Schools 
 ADM High School
ADM High School is located in Adel and serves students in grades 9–12. The high school was constructed in 1986 with an addition added in 2015.
In 2022, ADM High School was ranked as the 9th best high school in Iowa and the 3rd best high school in the Des Moines Metro Iowa by US News.
 ADM Middle School
ADM Middle School is located in Adel, serves students in grades 7–8. The middle school was constructed in 2006 with an addition added in 2015. 
In 2022, ADM Middle School was ranked as the 3rd highest scoring middle school in Iowa as measured by the Iowa Department of Educations Iowa School Performance Profiles and been recognized as a model professional learning community by Solution Tree.
DeSoto Intermediate
DeSoto Intermediate is located in De Soto, and serves students in grades 5-6. The original building was constructed in 1922, with gymnasium and classroom additions completed in 1990 and additional classroom additions added in 2015.
Meadow View Elementary
Meadow View Elementary is located in Adel and serves students in grades 2-4. Meadow View Elementary was constructed in 2021.
Adel Elementary
Adel Elementary is located in Adel, and serves students in grades PS–1. The original building was constructed in 1965, with additions in 1969, 1990, 2006, and 2015.

ADM High School

Athletics
The ADM Tigers compete in the Raccoon River Conference and offer the following sports:

Men's sports
Baseball
Basketball
Bowling
Cross Country
Football
Golf
Boys' - 1984 Class 2A state champions
Soccer
Swimming
Tennis
Track & Field
Wrestling
1970 Class A state champions
Cross country (boys and girls)

Swimming (girls)
Volleyball (girls)
Football
 1933 state champions

Women's Sports
Basketball
Cross Country
Girls' 1968 state champions
Golf
Soccer
Softball
1970 state champions
Swimming
Tennis
Track & Field
Volleyball
Wrestling

CO-ED

 Dance
 Cheer

See also
List of school districts in Iowa
List of high schools in Iowa

References

External links
 Adel DeSoto Minburn Schools official website.
 Adel DeSoto Minburn Activities official website.
 

School districts in Iowa
Education in Dallas County, Iowa
Education in Madison County, Iowa
Des Moines metropolitan area
1993 establishments in Iowa
School districts established in 1993